Jeremy Zucker (born March 3, 1996) is an American singer-songwriter, best known for his songs "Comethru", "You Were Good to Me", and "All the Kids Are Depressed". Since he first began publishing music in 2015, Zucker has released multiple EPs and two full-length albums, Love Is Not Dying (2020) and Crusher (2021).

Early life 
Originally from Franklin Lakes, New Jersey, Zucker was raised in a musical household with his parents and two older brothers. While a student at Ramapo High School, he began making music in his bedroom and later joined a band called the "Foreshadows". The first song he's ever written was actually about his brother's fear of heights. After graduating high school, he attended Colorado College where he graduated in 2018 with a degree in molecular biology. Before producing his own music, his first job was as a snowboard instructor.

Career

2015–2019: Beach Island, Breathe, Motions, and glisten 
In 2015, Zucker released his debut EP Beach Island. He released Breathe containing his breakthrough hit "'Bout It" in December 2016. In 2017, Zucker released Motions, featuring the song "Heavy," which later Blackbear remixed into "Make Daddy Proud" and included on his album Digital Druglord. Zucker and Blackbear later collaborated on the single "Talk Is Overrated" on Zucker's EP Idle. Zucker released Stripped. in February 2018, followed by Glisten in May 2018. In September 2018, Zucker released Summer,, which contains the song "Comethru." He wrote "Comethru" as a response to graduating college in May 2018 and moving back to his childhood home in New Jersey.

2019-present: brent, love is not dying, brent ii and CRUSHER 
In 2019, Zucker collaborated with singer Chelsea Cutler on "You Were Good to Me." The song was the lead single of their first collaborative EP Brent which was released on April 19, 2019.

On July 26, Zucker released "Oh, Mexico," the lead single for his debut album Love Is Not Dying. The subsequent singles "Always, I'll Care," "Not Ur Friend," and "Julia" were released on February 7, 2020, February 28, and March 24 respectively, leading up to the album's release on April 17. The album is an autobiographical collection of songs that were recorded in Brooklyn during the second half of 2019. On July 24, he released the single "Supercuts". He featured on Claire Rosinkranz's song "Backyard Boy" and "Nothing's the Same" with Alexander 23.

On January 15, 2021, Zucker and Cutler released "This Is How You Fall In Love" and they hosted the livestream show Brent: Live on the Internet where they introduced Brent II, which was released on February 5. Beginning in June 2021, Zucker released the songs "18" on June 24, "Honest" on July 23, "Cry With You" on August 20, and "Therapist" on September 17 as singles for his sophomore album Crusher which was released on October 1, 2021.

Influences 
Zucker has cited Blink-182, Jon Bellion, blackbear, Eden, Bon Iver, Mac Miller, and Wet as some of his musical influences.

His music has been described as "a fusion of organic airy beats, lush soundtrack-style soundscapes, and biting Tumblr-worthy lyricism."

Zucker describes himself as a "social introvert".

Discography

Studio albums

Live albums

EPs

Singles

As lead artist

As featured artist

Remixes 
 2018: Atoms – Said the Sky Remix (RL Grime with Jeremy Zucker, Said The Sky)
 2018: Talk Is Overrated [manila killa remix] (Jeremy Zucker with blackbear, Manila Killa)
 2018: Better Off [filous Remix] (Jeremy Zucker with Chelsea Cutler, filousa)
 2020: You Were Good to Me [shallou remix] (Jeremy Zucker with Chelsea Cutler, Shallou)

Songwriting credits

Producing credits

Tours

Headlining 

 Tour Is Overrated (2017)
 Anything, Anywhere Tour (2018–2019)
 Love Is Not Dying Tour (2020) [canceled due COVID-19 pandemic]
MORE NOISE!!!! Tour (2021–2022)

Livestream 
 Brent: Live on the Internet (2021; with Chelsea Cutler) [changes due COVID-19 pandemic]

Supporting 

 I Met You When I Was 18 World Tour (2018; for Lauv; in United States)
 ~ How I'm Feeling ~ Tour (2020; for Lauv; in Australia, New Zealand, Indonesia) [canceled due COVID-19 pandemic]

References 

1996 births
American male singer-songwriters
American singer-songwriters
Colorado College alumni
Living people
21st-century American singers
21st-century American male singers
People from Franklin Lakes, New Jersey
Ramapo High School (New Jersey) alumni